Peter Martin Visscher  is a Dutch-born Australian geneticist who is professor and chair of Quantitative Genetics at the University of Queensland. He is also a professorial research fellow at the University of Queensland's Institute for Molecular Bioscience and an affiliate professor at their Queensland Brain Institute.

Education
Visscher was educated at the University of Edinburgh, where he was awarded a PhD in 1991 for research supervised by Bill Hill.

Career and research
Visscher is known for his research aimed at investigating the genetic bases of complex human traits. His research also focuses on studies in trait variation in populations. Visscher applied statistical analysis methods to quantify and dissect the contribution of DNA polymorphisms to variation.

Honors and awards
Visscher is a senior principal research fellow of the National Health and Medical Research Council. He was elected a Fellow of the Australian Academy of Science in 2010. He was elected a foreign member of the Royal Netherlands Academy of Arts and Sciences and fellow of and the Royal Society in 2018. Also in 2018, he received a Laureate Fellowship from the Australian Research Council.

References

Living people
Australian geneticists
Academic staff of the University of Queensland
Alumni of the University of Edinburgh
Human geneticists
Population geneticists
Statistical geneticists
Genetic epidemiologists
Fellows of the Australian Academy of Science
Members of the Royal Netherlands Academy of Arts and Sciences
Australian Fellows of the Royal Society
Dutch emigrants to Australia
Year of birth missing (living people)